Frederick Naumetz (March 28, 1922January 2, 1998) was a professional American football center and linebacker in the National Football League. He played five seasons for the Los Angeles Rams. Naumetz played college football at Boston College and was drafted by the Cleveland Rams in the third round of the 1943 NFL Draft.

References

External links
 

1922 births
1998 deaths
American football centers
American football linebackers
Boston College Eagles football players
Los Angeles Rams players
United States Navy personnel of World War II
Players of American football from Massachusetts
Deaths from cancer in California